Love-In is a live album by jazz saxophonist Charles Lloyd recorded at the Fillmore Auditorium in San Francisco by the Charles Lloyd Quartet featuring Keith Jarrett, Ron McClure and Jack DeJohnette. Selections from the same concert were also released as Journey Within.

Reception
The Allmusic review by Thom Jurek awarded the album 4 stars and states: "On Love-In, everything was jazz for the Charles Lloyd Quartet, and what they made jazz from opened the music up to everybody who heard it. The album is a lasting testament to that cultural ecumenism".

Track listing
All compositions by Charles Lloyd except as indicated
 "Tribal Dance" - 10:20  
 "Temple Bells" - 2:58  
 "Is It Really the Same??" (Keith Jarrett) - 6:04  
 "Here, There and Everywhere" (John Lennon, Paul McCartney) - 3:52  
 "Love-In" - 4:57  
 "Sunday Morning" (Jarrett) - 8:11  
 "Memphis Blues Again/Island Blues" - 9:10  
Recorded on January 27, 1967 at the Fillmore Auditorium, San Francisco, California

Personnel
Charles Lloyd - tenor saxophone, flute
Keith Jarrett - piano
Ron McClure - bass
Jack DeJohnette - drums

Production
Wally Heider - recording engineer
Stanislaw Zagorski - cover design
Jim Marshall - cover photography

References

Charles Lloyd (jazz musician) live albums
1967 live albums
albums produced by George Avakian
Atlantic Records live albums